Michael Foley  is a Gaelic footballer from County Leitrim, Ireland, and is a panel member of the Leitrim county team since 2002. He has played for Leitrim at all levels, winning a Connacht Minor Football Championship in 1998 and a Connacht Junior Football Championship in 2004.

He is a former member of the Dunkeerin club, before he transferred to Kilcock in Kildare.

He is known as an ace freetaker with his county.

References
 http://www.leitrimgaa.ie/profiles.php?playerid=0027
 http://hoganstand.com/leitrim/ArticleForm.aspx?ID=94268

Year of birth missing (living people)
Living people
Irish schoolteachers
Dunkeerin Gaelic footballers
Kilcock Gaelic footballers
Leitrim inter-county Gaelic footballers